Qumlaq (also, Kumlak and Kumlakh) is a village and municipality in the Oghuz Rayon of Azerbaijan.  It has a population of 1,480.  The municipality consists of the villages of Qumlaq and Hallavar.

References 

Populated places in Oghuz District